Doraemon Land is a Spanish game show based on the anime and manga series Doraemon. The space was produced by 60dB, Luk Internacional and Turnek. The show was broadcast on Boing channel on everynight Friday at 9 PM. MC was actress Malaga Laura Artolachipi.

History 
In the second quarter of 2014 Spain Media was attracted the player through two ways: the first was writing one's name on the Boing website, and the second was a voice test at Malaga between 30–31 May 2014 and at Madrid between 6–7 June 2014.

Episodes

Contestants

References 

 :es:Doraemon Land
 

Spanish game shows
Doraemon